Ciemno  is a village in the administrative district of Gmina Tuchomie, within Bytów County, Pomeranian Voivodeship, in northern Poland. 

The village has a population of 203.

References

Ciemno